Matt Ricehouse (born March 11, 1987) is an American professional mixed martial artist who most recently competed for the Strikeforce promotion. Matt is currently a black belt in Brazilian Jiu Jitsu under Rodrigo Vaghi (a fifth degree black belt under Rickson Gracie) and trains out of St. Charles MMA in St. Charles, MO under head coach Mike Rogers.

Mixed martial arts career

Early career
Ricehouse began MMA as an amateur in 2007, amassing a record of 7 wins and no losses over the next three years.

Ricehouse made his professional debut in January 2010.

Strikeforce
Ricehouse made his Strikeforce debut in May 2010 as he faced Gregory Wilson at Strikeforce: Heavy Artillery.  He won the fight via submission.

He returned to the promotion in late 2010 as he faced Tom Aaron at Strikeforce: Henderson vs. Babalu II.  He won the fight via unanimous decision.

Ricehouse next bout was six months later as he faced highly touted Ryan Couture at Strikeforce Challengers: Fodor vs. Terry.  He won the fight via unanimous decision, giving the young Couture the first defeat on his professional record.

For his fourth fight in the promotion, Ricehouse faced grappler Bill Cooper at Strikeforce Challengers: Britt vs. Sayers.  He won the fight via unanimous decision for the third consecutive time.

On August 18, 2012, Ricehouse suffered his first defeat at Strikeforce: Rousey vs. Kaufman to Bobby Green via unanimous decision. Despite going 4-1 under the Strikeforce banner, Ricehouse was not among the fighters brought over to the Ultimate Fighting Championship following the closure of Strikeforce that December and their subsequent talent merger.

Mixed martial arts record

|-
| Loss
| align=center| 6–1
| Bobby Green
| Decision (unanimous)
| Strikeforce: Rousey vs. Kaufman
| 
| align=center| 3
| align=center| 5:00
| San Diego, California, United States
| 
|-
| Win
| align=center| 6–0
| Bill Cooper
| Decision (unanimous)
| Strikeforce Challengers: Britt vs. Sayers
| 
| align=center| 3
| align=center| 5:00
| Las Vegas, Nevada, United States
| 
|-
| Win
| align=center| 5–0
| Ryan Couture
| Decision (unanimous)
| Strikeforce Challengers: Fodor vs. Terry
| 
| align=center| 3
| align=center| 5:00
| Kent, Washington, United States
| 
|-
| Win
| align=center| 4–0
| Tom Aaron
| Decision (unanimous)
| Strikeforce: Henderson vs. Babalu II
| 
| align=center| 3
| align=center| 5:00
| St.Louis, Missouri, United States
| 
|-
| Win
| align=center| 3–0
| Mike Foster
| TKO (punches)
| Premier Combat League - Bad Intentions 
| 
| align=center| 2
| align=center| 1:27
| Glen Carbon, Illinois, United States
| 
|-
| Win
| align=center| 2–0
| Gregory Wilson
| Submission (rear-naked choke)
| Strikeforce: Heavy Artillery
| 
| align=center| 3
| align=center| 0:45
| St. Louis, Missouri, United States
| 
|-
| Win
| align=center| 1–0
| Tim Thomas
| TKO (punches)
| DFC - Devastation Fight Club
| 
| align=center| 3
| align=center| 1:34
| Cape Girardeau, Missouri, United States
|

References

External links
 

American male mixed martial artists
1987 births
Lightweight mixed martial artists
Mixed martial artists utilizing Brazilian jiu-jitsu
Living people
American practitioners of Brazilian jiu-jitsu
People awarded a black belt in Brazilian jiu-jitsu
Mixed martial artists from Missouri